Google Test (also known as gtest) is a unit testing library for the C++ programming language, based on the xUnit architecture. The library is released under the BSD 3-clause license. It can be compiled for a variety of POSIX and Windows platforms, allowing unit-testing of C sources as well as C++ with minimal source modification.

Projects using Google Test
Besides being developed and used at Google, many other projects implement Google Test as well:
    
 Android Open Source Project operating system
 Chromium projects (behind the Chrome browser and ChromeOS)
 LLVM compiler
 Protocol Buffers (Google's data interchange format)
 OpenCV computer vision library
 Robot Operating System
 Gromacs molecular dynamics simulation package

Related tools

Google Test UI is a test runner that runs test binary, allows to track progress via a progress bar, and displays a list of test failures. Google Test UI is written in C#. Additionally, a feature-complete Visual Studio extension exists with Google Test Adapter.

See also

List of unit testing frameworks
CppUnit

References

Further reading

External links
 Google Test
 Google Test Primer documentation
 Gtest C/C++ Conan package
 A quick introduction to the Google C++ Testing Framework, Arpan Sen, IBM DeveloperWorks, 2010-05-11
 The Google Test and Development Environment, Anthony Vallone, 2014-01-21

C++ libraries
Extreme programming
Freedesktop.org
Unit testing frameworks
Software using the BSD license